Ishpeming Public School District is a public school district located in Ishpeming, Michigan, that serves approximately 700 K-12 students. The district is composed of an elementary school, a middle school and a high school. The W. C. Peterson Auditorium is located within the district's high school and middle school complex.

History 
In 1868, before Ishpeming was incorporated as a village in 1869 and a city four years later, a charter to form a school district was granted.  The meeting to organize the school district was called by Julius Ropes who started the Ropes Gold Mine north of town. The first school house in the district was built at the Cleveland Mine, Michigan. It was a single story frame building which was closed in 1870, with a new school being erected on Ready Street at a cost of $2,000.

In 1874, the Division Street School was built at a cost of $38,000. This is the site of the current high school. It was said that the building was poorly constructed and teachers would complain about hauling coal to their room's individual coal stove. In 1908 the school was demolished to make room for a better planned high school.

This new high school was built in 1908, but like the previous building, it had a relatively short life. In 1930, it was destroyed by fire and students attended classes in various community buildings. The following year the high school was rebuilt  and it still is the functioning high school for the district. The high school, however, has seen several updates in recent years. These updates include a new gymnasium and a completely renovated Technology and Fine Arts wing.

In addition to the Division Street School, Ishpeming has had several other school buildings. One of them was High Street School built in 1896 and later demolished to make room for the C.L. Phelps Middle School which was built and dedicated in 1959. At the time the school was hailed for its possession of a large arts wing and industrial art facilities, in addition to a large home economics space. The C.L. Phelps school was closed by the district in 2010 and was subsequently sold to G.A. Haan Development in 2014. Haan Development purchased the building to renovate it into a multi-unit apartment complex.

In 1957 the district completed construction on Birchview Elementary School. This school originally contained only eight classrooms, but it was expanded in 1971 to accommodate an influx in the student population. In 2014, voters approved a bond proposal which expanded and upgraded the school by adding classrooms and modern computer labs.

Ishpeming Middle/High School
Ishpeming School District's Middle and High school are located in one complex. Ishpeming High School offers students many courses, extracurricular activities, and athletic opportunities. The high school offers courses in business, foreign languages (including Spanish, French, and German), physical education, health, industrial technology, mathematics, language arts, science, and social studies. The high school also offers Advanced Placement English, chemistry, and biology. As of 2018, all students are required to have one credit in child development or independent living courses to graduate. Available industrial arts courses include instruction in woodworking, welding, electromechanical technology, and aircraft maintenance. Ishpeming's "Geometry in Construction" class was used as a state model for CTE instruction. Outside of courses, Ishpeming High School offers several school-sponsored extracurricular activities including: Key Club, drama, yearbook, National Honor Society, student council, Youth in Government, and S.A.D.D.

Ishpeming Middle School offers core classes in language arts, mathematics, science, and social studies. In addition, students can take classes in health, physical education, fine arts, and music. Students also have the opportunity to join organizations like builder's club, yearbook, and student council.

Athletics 
The high school's athletic program known as Ishpeming Hematites, offers several programs. Students have the opportunity to join basketball, bowling, cheerleading, track and field, cross-country, football, dance, golf, gymnastics, ice hockey, swimming, softball, and volleyball. Students can take advantage of the gymnasiums and the weight room while training for athletics. Ishpeming Middle School offers several athletic opportunities for students in seventh and eighth grade, including basketball, cheerleading, and track and field.

Future Michigan State University head coaching legend Tom Izzo was head basketball coach at Ishpeming High School from 1977-78.

Birchview Elementary School
Birchview offers elementary students a comprehensive curriculum. Students also have the opportunity to engage in special events like Young Authors, and the Liberty Children's Art Program. Students have access to Title I programming.

References

External links
Ishpeming Public Schools

School districts in Michigan
1868 establishments in Michigan
Education in Marquette County, Michigan
School districts established in 1868